The Santa Fe class 3450 consisted of ten 4-6-4 "Hudson" type steam locomotives built by the Baldwin Locomotive Works in 1927. Built as coal-burners, they were later converted to oil-burning during the 1930s. Their early service was in the Midwest, between Chicago and Colorado; later, some were assigned to service in the San Joaquin Valley of California between Bakersfield and Oakland.

They were smaller and less powerful locomotives than the later 3460 class "Hudson" type, but were capable of equivalently high speeds.

The first locomotive built, No. 3450, was donated by the Santa Fe in 1955 to the Railway & Locomotive Historical Society's Southern California chapter, and is preserved at the Society's museum in the Los Angeles County Fair grounds at Pomona, California. The locomotive sits inside the RailGiants Train Museum. It is not operational, but preserved in good condition as a static exhibit. It received a cosmetic restoration between 2013-2021.

Other Images

References 

 
 
 

3450 class
Baldwin locomotives
4-6-4 locomotives
Railway locomotives introduced in 1927
Steam locomotives of the United States
Passenger locomotives
Standard gauge locomotives of the United States